Ab Kuleh Sar, also rendered as Ab Kalleh Sar or Abkaleh Sar, may refer to:
 Ab Kuleh Sar-e Bozorg
 Ab Kuleh Sar-e Kuchak